is the twelfth single by Japanese singer Angela Aki, released on July 11, 2012 in two editions, standard and limited. The song was used as the second ending theme song in the Japanese anime Space Brothers (宇宙兄弟/Uchū Kyōdai). Aki was inspired by Russian-American singer Regina Spektor when writing this song.

She performed the track at Music Japan.

Track listing

CD

Limited Edition Bonus Track

DVD

Charts

Release History

References

External links 
 Official discography 

2012 singles
Angela Aki songs
Japanese-language songs
Songs written by Angela Aki
2012 songs